Kevin Michael Beaver (born September 17, 1977) is an American criminologist and the Judith Rich Harris Professor of Criminology at Florida State University's College of Criminology and Criminal Justice, where he is also the director of the Distance Learning Program.

Education
Beaver graduated from Ohio University in 2000 with a B.A. in sociology, and received his M.S. in criminal justice in 2001 from the University of Cincinnati. He went on to receive his Ph.D. in criminal justice, also from the University of Cincinnati, in 2006.

Career
Beaver joined the faculty of Northern Kentucky University in 2006 as an instructor in the Department of Political Science and Criminal Justice. That same year, he joined Florida State as an assistant professor, and became an associate professor in 2010.

Research
Beaver's research focuses on the field of biosocial criminology, including studies on the causes of antisocial behaviors, such as delinquency, which he has said has both genetic and environmental causes. He has also researched the link between parenting behavior and child intelligence, as well as the potential for genetic factors to contribute to academic achievement in children. His research has also found a link between a rare form of the MAOA gene (known as the "warrior gene") and violent behavior and weapon use among boys.

Editorial activities
Beaver is the editor-in-chief of the Journal of Drug Issues.

References

External links
Faculty page
Profile at Google Scholar

American criminologists
1977 births
Living people
Florida State University faculty
Ohio University alumni
University of Cincinnati alumni